In the second Battle of Kōnodai, fought in 1564, Hōjō Ujiyasu led his men to victory against Satomi Yoshihiro. Both Ujiyasu and Yoshihiro were the sons of the commanders at the first battle of Kōnodai, in which Hōjō Ujitsuna defeated the combined forces of Satomi Yoshitaka and Ashikaga Yoshiaki (Oyumi).

Outnumbered 20,000 to 8,000, Satomi fell back when the Hōjō vanguard advanced. But this was a feint, and an attempt to draw his enemy into a trap. However, Hōjō Ujiyasu expected a trap of this sort, and had sent his son, Ujimasa, with a small force to attack the Satomi rear, surrounding, and later Ujiyasu defeated Yoshihiro.

Hōjō Ujiyasu celebrated his victory with a poem:
 Conquering the foe
 As I wished at Kōnodai
 Now do I behold
 The evening sunshine of Katsuura

In the ensuing battle, Satomi Yoshihiro saw his son Chokuro killed by Matsuda Yasuyoshi, a Hōjō retainer; after the battle, feeling remorse at killing such a young boy, Matsuda entered the clergy.

Notes

References
 Turnbull, Stephen (1998). 'The Samurai Sourcebook'. London: Cassell & Co.
 Turnbull, Stephen (2002). 'War in Japan: 1467-1615'. Oxford: Osprey Publishing.

Konodai 1564
1564 in Japan
Conflicts in 1564